ITU Faculty of Mechanical Engineering is a faculty of the Istanbul Technical University, ITU.

The faculty is located on the university's :tr:Gümüşsuyu, Beyoğlu campus in Istanbul, and has two departments:
 Mechanical engineering
 Manufacturing engineering

Notable alumni 
 Necmettin Erbakan
 Çağla Kubat
 Üzeyir Garih
 Mehmet Toner

References

External links 
 ITU Faculty of Mechanical Engineering
 ITU Faculty of Mechanical Engineering, photos
 History and former deans
 Department of Manufacturing engineering
 Department of Mechanical Engineering

Istanbul Technical University